The men's featherweight event was part of the weightlifting programme at the 1936 Summer Olympics. The weight class was the lightest contested, and allowed weightlifters of up to 60 kilograms (132 pounds). The competition was held on Sunday, 2 August 1936. Twenty-one weightlifters from 13 nations competed.

Medalists

Records
These were the standing world and Olympic records (in kilograms) prior to the 1936 Summer Olympics.

Anthony Terlazzo and Georg Liebsch both equalized the standing Olympic record in press with 92.5 kilograms. Anthony Terlazzo and Anton Richter both improved the Olympic record in snatch with 97.5 kilograms. Saleh Soliman and Ibrahim Shams both bettered the Olympic record in clean and jerk with 125 kilograms, and Anthony Terlazzo set a new Olympic record in total with 312.5 kilograms.

Results

All figures in kilograms.

References

Sources
 Olympic Report
 

Featherweight